Anthene lycaenoides, the pale ciliate blue, is a butterfly of the family Lycaenidae. It is found from Malaya to New Guinea.

The larvae feed on Bridelia tomentosa, Rhyssopterys timorensis, Flagellaria indica, Clerodendrum floribundum, Oxera splendida, Cupaniopsis anacardioides, Pongamia pinnata, Caesalpina crista, Senna alata, Cassia fistula, Senna gaudichaudii and Senna surattensis.

Subspecies
A. l. lycaenoides (Ambon, Serang)
A. l. pegobates (Holland, 1900) (Buru, Obi, Halmahera, Ternate, Bahcan)
A. l. sutrana (Fruhstorfer, 1916) (Kai Island, West Irian)
A. l. godeffroyi (Semper, [1879]) (Australia (Darwin, Cape York - Cairns)

References

External links
 Australian Caterpillars

Butterflies described in 1860
Anthene
Butterflies of Asia
Taxa named by Baron Cajetan von Felder